Cephalipterum is a genus of flowering plants in the family Asteraceae.

There is only one known species,  Cephalipterum drummondii, endemic to Australia (South Australia and Western Australia).

References

Monotypic Asteraceae genera
Endemic flora of Australia
Gnaphalieae